Steven John Fromholz (June 8, 1945 – January 19, 2014) was an American singer-songwriter who was selected as the Poet Laureate of Texas for 2007.

Biography
Steven Fromholz was born in Temple, Texas, United States, and graduated from high school in Denton, Texas in 1963. That same year, he began at North Texas State College where he was president of the Folk Music Club. He served in the United States Navy in California from 1963 to 1968 and began performing during this time. After leaving the Navy, he teamed with Dan McCrimmon to create the group Frummox. Fromholz also played with Stephen Stills and Rick Roberts before going solo. Willie Nelson recorded Fromholz's "I'd Have to be Crazy" (it reached number 11 on Billboard's Hot Country Singles chart and Fromholz sang harmony) and Lyle Lovett covered "Texas Trilogy" and "Bears."  Other artists who have recorded his songs include Hoyt Axton, John Denver, Jerry Jeff Walker, and Sturgill Simpson.

In addition to singing and songwriting, Fromholz dabbled in acting, playwriting, poetry, record producing, narrating, jingle-writing and whitewater river guiding. In 2007, he was named Poet Laureate of the State of Texas by the Texas State Legislature. His latest book is Steven Fromholz: New and Selected Works.

He had two daughters; Darcie (to whom the song "Dear Darcie" is dedicated) and Felicity (for whom his record label Felicity Records is named). His life and works are the subject of an Austin Sayre documentary film currently in production titled "The Man with the Big Hat."

Here to There
Fromholz's first album, Here to There, has become a difficult-to-find Texas classic, as it has long been out of print.

It was recorded with music partner Dan McCrimmon as the duo "Frummox" in 1969 on ABC Probe Records, CPLP 4511.  This album is a seminal work, pre-dating and foreshadowing the Texas Music scene-to-come, when Willie Nelson relocated from Nashville to Austin and became the icon of "Outlaw" music. This album has never been officially released on CD. Notable on the album is his "Texas Trilogy," a set of three songs meant to be played as one long work: "Daybreak," "Trainride," and "Bosque County Romance," portraying life in rural Texas in the 1950s, set in the town of Kopperl, in Bosque County, Texas.

Track list (time):
"Man With The Big Hat" (6:00)
"Kansas Legend" (2:43)
"Song For Stephen Stills (High Country Caravan)" (3:57)
"Jake's Song" (3:23)
"Texas Trilogy: a) Daybreak" (3:18)
"Texas Trilogy: b) Trainride" (2:21)
"Texas Trilogy: c) Bosque County Romance & Daybreak (reprise)" (4:38)
"There You Go" (2:45)
"Weaving Is The Property Of Few These Days" (3:36)
"Lovin' Mind" (2:40")

Texas Trilogy
Fromholz's "Texas Trilogy" was the basis of a book by Craig D. Hillis and Bruce F. Jordan, Texas Trilogy: Life in a Small Texas Town, in which the authors accompanied and illustrated the trilogy's lyrics, set in the town of Kopperl, Texas, with photographs of the surrounding landscape. It also contains interviews with principal characters within the town. The book was praised for its photographs, though not for its text.

In addition, Fromholz himself published a book called Texas Trilogy.

Death
In the early afternoon of January 19, 2014 Fromholz was fatally injured when a rifle fell from its case and discharged.  He died en route to the hospital.  The accident occurred as Fromholz was making preparations to hunt feral hogs who were killing the baby goats on a ranch near his residence outside Eldorado, Texas. He is buried in the nearby Fort McKavett Cemetery.

References

External links 
 

 

1945 births
2014 deaths
American country singer-songwriters
Country musicians from Texas
Accidental deaths in Texas
Deaths by firearm in Texas
Poets Laureate of Texas
People from Temple, Texas
University of North Texas alumni
Firearm accident victims in the United States
Hunting accident deaths
Cowboy poets
Singer-songwriters from Texas
People from Eldorado, Texas
United States Navy sailors